The ocellated moray (Gymnothorax saxicola) is a species of moray eel from the Western Atlantic. It occasionally is found in the aquarium trade. It grows to 60 cm in length.

References

 

saxicola
Fish described in 1891
Fish of the Atlantic Ocean
Taxa named by David Starr Jordan